24 is the first greatest hits album by contemporary Christian music group Point of Grace. It was released in 2003 by Word Records. The album title refers to the group's 24 consecutive #1 hits on the Billboard Contemporary Christian Songs chart.

One new song was recorded for the album: "Day by Day," which was founding member Terry Jones' final recording with the group, prior to her departure in 2004, when she was replaced by Leigh Cappillino.

The album was originally released in a digipak with only the words "Point of Grace" and "24" on the cover. It was later reissued in a standard 2CD jewel case with a photo of the group added to the cover, then again with a photo including Cappillino, though she does not appear on the album.

Two tie-ins to the album were released: a book written by the group, titled Keep the Candle Burning: 24 Reflections on Our Favorite Songs, and a DVD of music videos, titled 7 (a play on the phrase "24/7").

Track listing

 Disc 1, track 1: New recording, 2003
 Disc 1, tracks 2–7: From Point of Grace, 1993
 Disc 1, tracks 8–12: From The Whole Truth, 1995
 Disc 2, tracks 1–4: From Life, Love & Other Mysteries, 1996
 Disc 2, tracks 5–10: From Steady On, 1998
 Disc 2, tracks 11–13: From Free to Fly, 2001

References

Point of Grace albums
Albums produced by Michael Omartian
Albums produced by Brown Bannister
2003 compilation albums